The 1941 World Series matched the New York Yankees against the Brooklyn Dodgers, with the Yankees winning in five games to capture their fifth title in six years, and their ninth overall.

The name "Subway Series" arose for a World Series played between two New York City teams. The series was punctuated by the Dodgers' Mickey Owen's dropped third strike of a sharply breaking curveball (a suspected spitball) pitched by Hugh Casey in the ninth inning of Game 4. The play led to a Yankees rally and brought them one win away from another championship.

The Yankees were back after a one-year hiatus, having won 13 of their last 14 Series games and 28 of their last 31.

This was the first Subway Series between the Brooklyn Dodgers and New York Yankees (though the Yankees had already faced the crosstown New York Giants five times). These two teams would meet a total of seven times from 1941 to 1956 — the Dodgers' only victory coming in 1955 — with an additional four matchups after the Dodgers left for Los Angeles, most recently in 1981.

Summary

†: postponed from October 3 due to rain

Matchups

Game 1

Joe Gordon's home run in the second inning off of Curt Davis put the Yankees up 1–0. In the fourth inning, Charlie Keller walked with two outs and scored on Bill Dickey's double to extend the lead to 2–0. The Dodgers cut it to 2–1 in the fifth inning when Pee Wee Reese singled with two outs off of Red Ruffing and scored on Mickey Owen's triple. In the sixth inning, after a one-out walk and single, Gordon's RBI single made it 3–1 Yankees. After a single and error, pinch-hitter Lew Riggs' single scored Cookie Lavagetto in the seventh inning as the Dodgers pulled to within 3–2. Then they threatened in the ninth inning with hits by Joe Medwick and Pee Wee Reese, before Ruffing was able to get Herman Franks to ground into a game-ending 4-6-3 double play.

Game 2

The Yankees struck first in Game 2 on Spud Chandler's RBI single in the second with runners on second and third, but Joe Gordon was thrown out at home trying to score to end the inning. Next inning, Charlie Keller's RBI single with two on made it 2–0 Yankees. In the fifth, the Dodgers loaded the bases off of Chandler with no outs on a double and two walks when Pee Wee Reese's sacrifice fly and Mickey Owen's RBI single tied the game. Next inning, an error and single put two on with no outs off of Chandler, then Dolph Camilli's single off relief pitcher Johnny Murphy in the sixth put the Dodgers up 3–2. Wyatt gave up a pinch single to George Selkirk leading off the ninth, but nailed down a complete-game victory.

Game 3

With the veteran Freddie Fitzsimmons dueling young southpaw Marius Russo, there was no score into the top of the seventh. With two outs, Russo lined a drive off Fitzsimmons' knee that broke his kneecap. The ball caromed into Pee Wee Reese's glove for the third out, but Fitzsimmons was forced from the game. Hugh Casey, who came out to pitch in the eighth for Brooklyn, promptly gave up four straight one-out singles, the last two of which to Joe DiMaggio and Charlie Keller scoring a run each. The Dodgers made it a one-run game in the bottom half when Dixie Walker hit a leadoff double and scored on Pee Wee Reese's single, but Russo pitched a perfect ninth for a complete game as the Yankees won 2–1.

Game 4

In Game 4, the Yankees struck first in the top of the first on Charlie Keller's RBI single with two on off of Kirby Higbe. In the fourth, they loaded the bases with no outs on a double, walk and single and two outs later, Johnny Sturm's two-run single made it 3–0 Yankees and knock Higbe out of the game. In the bottom half, Atley Donald walked two with two outs before both runners scored on Jimmy Wasdell's double. Next inning, Pete Reiser's two-run home run put the Dodgers up 4–3, but with two out, two strikes and no runners on base in the ninth, the Yankees rallied off of Hugh Casey. First Tommy Henrich swung and missed, which would have ended the game, but Dodger catcher Mickey Owen failed to catch the ball and Henrich reached first base. Owen recollected the incident:

Joe DiMaggio followed with a single and Charlie Keller hit a double to drive in Henrich and DiMaggio and take the lead. Bill Dickey would follow up with a walk and, along with Keller, score on a Joe Gordon double to make the final score 7–4. Johnny Murphy pitched two shutout innings to close the game as the Yankees were one win away from the championship.

Meyer Berger of The New York Times covered the events in "Casey in the Box", a poem derived from the 1888 classic "Casey at the Bat".

Game 5

In the fifth inning, Whit Wyatt and Joe DiMaggio almost came to blows on the mound as DiMaggio returned to the dugout after flying out. Tiny Bonham pitched a complete game 4-hitter, allowing only one hit and one walk after the third inning. In the second, with runners on first and third, a wild pitch by Wyatt and RBI single by Joe Gordon made it 2–0 Yankees. Pete Reiser's sacrifice fly in the third with two on cut it to 2–1, but the Yankees got that run back in the fifth on Tommy Henrich's home run. The Dodgers hit only .182 as a team, contributing to their 5-game loss.

Composite box
1941 World Series (4–1): New York Yankees (A.L.) over Brooklyn Dodgers (N.L.)

Aftermath
In 1947 the Yankees and Dodgers would meet in the World Series for the second time and again play a dramatic Game 4 which was decided on a lead change with two outs in the ninth inning. That time the Dodgers would be on the winning side to tie the series but would once again end up losing it. Ironically, in the 1947 game the Dodgers’ winning pitcher was none other than Hugh Casey – the Game 4 loser in 1941 – even though he pitched to only one batter.

Notes

References

External links

World Series
World Series
New York Yankees postseason
Brooklyn Dodgers postseason
World Series
World Series
Baseball competitions in New York City
1940s in the Bronx
1940s in Brooklyn
Flatbush, Brooklyn